Fabio Mazzucco (born 14 April 1999) is an Italian cyclist, who currently rides for UCI ProTeam . In October 2020, he was named in the startlist for the 2020 Giro d'Italia.

Major results

2016
 3rd Road race, National Junior Road Championships
 10th Trofeo Buffoni
 10th G.P. Sportivi di Sovilla
2017
 1st Gran Premio dell'Arno
 3rd Overall Giro della Lunigiana
 3rd Trofeo Buffoni
 3rd G.P. Sportivi di Sovilla
 8th Paris–Roubaix Juniors
2018
 5th Gran Premio Industrie del Marmo
 5th Gran Premio della Liberazione
 9th Overall Toscana-Terra di Ciclismo
2019
 1st Gran Premio Sportivi di Poggiana
 1st Stage 3 Giro Ciclistico d'Italia
 3rd Giro del Medio Brenta
 9th Trofeo Piva

Grand Tour general classification results timeline

References

External links

1999 births
Living people
Italian male cyclists
Cyclists from the Province of Padua